Tyntsy is a rural locality (a selo) in Vakhromeyevskoye Rural Settlement, Kameshkovsky District, Vladimir Oblast, Russia. The population was 148 as of 2010. There are 3 streets.

Geography 
Tyntsy is located 18 km north of Kameshkovo (the district's administrative centre) by road. Ryabinovka is the nearest rural locality.

References 

Rural localities in Kameshkovsky District